David Banks may refer to:

Sports
David Banks (cricketer, born 1961), English cricketer
David Banks (cricketer, born 1975), English cricketer
David Banks (rower) (born 1983), American Olympian
David Banks (soccer) (born 1967), English-American soccer player

Others
David Banks (actor) (born 1951), British actor
David Banks (climate adviser), American political advisor
David Banks (journalist) (1948–2022), British newspaper editor and broadcaster
David C. Banks (born 1959), American educator, chancellor of the New York City Dept. of Education
David L. Banks (born 1956), American statistician